Exaeretia fuscicostella is a moth in the family Depressariidae. It was described by Hugo Theodor Christoph in 1887. It is found in southern Kazakhstan, Turkmenistan, Uzbekistan, Kyrgyzstan, Libya, Arabia, Iran, Afghanistan and western Pakistan.

References

Moths described in 1887
Exaeretia
Moths of Asia